MV Loch Frisa is a ferry bought by Caledonian Maritime Assets for operation by Caledonian MacBrayne to serve between Oban and Craignure. She was originally named MV Utne and operated by Norled from 2015 to 2021. In December 2021, following a naming competition, CMAL announced her renaming as MV Loch Frisa.

History
MV Utne was launched in 2014 and operated by Norled from 2015. In 2021, Norled sold her to Caledonian Maritime Assets for €6.6 million (£5.6 million), as they were replacing their diesel-powered vessels with zero-emission battery-electric vessels.

Following a public vote, she will be renamed MV Loch Frisa. She was modified for her new role by Dales Marine in Leith, launched on 6 June 2022, and is expected to enter service in 2022.

There was an earlier Loch Frisa which served in Scottish waters, the  MacBrayne cargo steamer SS Loch Frisa, a general cargo ship which sailed under MacBrayne's houseflag in the 1950s and early 1960s.

Layout
Utne is a double-ended ro-ro ferry. As she has no crew accommodation, crew are based ashore. In Norway, she had two crews and was able to operate 18 hours a day.

Service
Utne was designed for service in a Norwegian fjord, and operated between Utne and Kvanndal on  the Hardangerfjord, a sheltered crossing of 2.5 miles.

Loch Frisa joined  on the Oban to Craignure, Isle of Mull route, replacing  as the second vessel. Her first public voyage, carrying four cars from Craignure to Oban, was on 13 June 2022. Coruisk moved back to Mallaig in summer 2022. During winter overhauls, Loch Frisa operated a single vessel timetable.

References

Caledonian MacBrayne
2014 ships
Ships built in Yalova
Ferries of Norway
Ferries of Scotland